The alphabet for Modern English is a Latin-script alphabet consisting of 26 letters, each having an upper- and lower-case form. The word alphabet is a compound of the first two letters of the Greek alphabet, alpha and beta. The alphabet originated around the 7th century CE to write Old English from Latin script. Since then, letters have been added or removed to give the current letters:

The exact shape of printed letters varies depending on the typeface (and font), and the standard printed form may differ significantly from the shape of handwritten letters (which varies between individuals), especially cursive.

The English alphabet has 5 vowels, 19 consonants, and 2 letters (Y and W) that can function as consonants or vowels.

Written English has a large number of digraphs (e.g., would, beak, moat); it stands out (almost uniquely) as a European language without diacritics in native words. The only exceptions are:

 a diaeresis (e.g., "coöperation") may be used to distinguish two vowels with separate pronunciation from a double vowel<ref>[https://web.archive.org/web/20101216160024/http://dscriber.com/news/121-the-new-yorkers-odd-mark-the-diaeresis "The New Yorker'''s Odd Mark—The Diaeresis"]</ref>
 a grave accent, very occasionally, (as in learnèd, an adjective) may be used to indicate that a normally silent vowel is pronounced

Letter names

The names of the letters are commonly spelled out in compound words and initialisms (e.g., tee-shirt, deejay, emcee, okay, etc.), derived forms (e.g., exed out, effing, to eff and blind, aitchless, etc.), and objects named after letters (e.g., en and em in printing, and wye in railroading). The spellings listed below are from the Oxford English Dictionary. Plurals of consonant names are formed by adding -s (e.g., bees, efs or effs, ems) or -es in the cases of aitches, esses, exes. Plurals of vowel names also take -es (i.e., aes, ees, ies, oes, ues), but these are rare. For a letter as a letter, the letter itself is most commonly used, generally in capitalized form, in which case the plural just takes -s or -'s (e.g. Cs or c's for cees).

 Etymology 
The names of the letters are for the most part direct descendants, via French, of the Latin (and Etruscan) names. (See Latin alphabet: Origins.)

The regular phonological developments (in rough chronological order) are:
Affects C.
 palatalization before front vowels of Latin  to Proto-Romance and Middle French . Affects G.
 fronting of Latin  to Middle French , becoming Middle English  and then Modern English . Affects Q, U.
Affects R.
 the Great Vowel Shift, shifting all Middle English long vowels. Affects A, B, C, D, E, G, H, I, K, O, P, T, and presumably Y.

The novel forms are aitch, a regular development of Medieval Latin acca; jay, a new letter presumably vocalized like neighboring kay to avoid confusion with established gee (the other name, jy, was taken from French); vee, a new letter named by analogy with the majority; double-u, a new letter, self-explanatory (the name of Latin V was ū); wye, of obscure origin but with an antecedent in Old French wi; izzard, from the Romance phrase i zed or i zeto "and Z" said when reciting the alphabet; and zee, an American levelling of zed by analogy with other consonants.

Some groups of letters, such as pee and bee, or em and en, are easily confused in speech, especially when heard over the telephone or a radio communications link. Spelling alphabets such as the ICAO spelling alphabet, used by aircraft pilots, police and others, are designed to eliminate this potential confusion by giving each letter a name that sounds quite different from any other.

Ampersand
The ampersand (&) has sometimes appeared at the end of the English alphabet, as in Byrhtferð's list of letters in 1011. & was regarded as the 27th letter of the English alphabet, as taught to children in the US and elsewhere. An example may be seen in M. B. Moore's 1863 book The Dixie Primer, for the Little Folks. Historically, the figure is a ligature for the letters Et. In English and many other languages, it is used to represent the word and, plus occasionally the Latin word et, as in the abbreviation &c (et cetera).

Archaic letters
Old and Middle English had a number of non-Latin letters that have since dropped out of use. These either took the names of the equivalent runes, since there were no Latin names to adopt, or (thorn, wyn) were runes themselves. 
Æ æ ash or æsc , used for the vowel , which disappeared from the language and then reformed. Replaced by ae and e now.
Replaced by th now.
Ŋ ŋ eng or engma, used for voiced velar nasal sound produced by "ng" in English. Replaced by ng now.
Œ œ ethel, ēðel, œ̄þel, etc. , used for the vowel , which disappeared from the language quite early. Replaced by oe and e now.
Ƿ ƿ wyn, ƿen or wynn , used for the consonant . (The letter 'w' had not yet been invented.) Replaced by w now.
Replaced by y, j and ch now.
ſ long s, an earlier form of the lowercase "s" that continued to be used alongside the modern lowercase s into the 1800s. Replaced by lowercase s now.

 Diacritics 

The most common diacritic marks seen in English publications are the acute (é), grave (è), circumflex (â, î, or ô), tilde (ñ), umlaut and diaeresis (ü or ï—the same symbol is used for two different purposes), and cedilla (ç). Diacritics used for tonal languages may be replaced with tonal numbers or omitted.

 Loanwords 
Diacritic marks mainly appear in loanwords such as naïve and façade. Informal English writing tends to omit diacritics because of their absence from the keyboard, while professional copywriters and typesetters tend to include them.

As such words become naturalised in English, there is a tendency to drop the diacritics, as has happened with many older borrowings from French, such as hôtel. Words that are still perceived as foreign tend to retain them; for example, the only spelling of soupçon found in English dictionaries (the OED and others) uses the diacritic. However, diacritics are likely to be retained even in naturalised words where they would otherwise be confused with a common native English word (for example, résumé rather than resume). Rarely, they may even be added to a loanword for this reason (as in maté, from Spanish yerba mate but following the pattern of café, from French, to distinguish from mate).

 Native English words 
Occasionally, especially in older writing, diacritics are used to indicate the syllables of a word: cursed (verb) is pronounced with one syllable, while cursèd (adjective) is pronounced with two. For this, è is used widely in poetry, e.g., in Shakespeare's sonnets. J.R.R. Tolkien used ë, as in O wingëd crown.

Similarly, while in chicken coop the letters -oo- represent a single vowel sound (a digraph), they less often represent two which may be marked with a diaresis as in zoölogist and coöperation. This use of the diaeresis is rare but found in some well-known publications, such as MIT Technology Review and The New Yorker. Some publications, particularly in UK usage, have replaced the diaeresis with a hyphen such as in co-operative. 

In general, these devices are not used even where they would serve to alleviate some degree of confusion.

 Punctuation marks within words 

 Apostrophe 
The apostrophe (ʼ) is not considered part of the English alphabet nor used as a diacritic, even in loanwords. But it is used for two important purposes in written English: to mark the "possessive" and to mark contracted words. Current standards require its use for both purposes. Therefore, apostrophes are necessary to spell many words even in isolation, unlike most punctuation marks, which are concerned with indicating sentence structure and other relationships among multiple words.

 It distinguishes (from the otherwise identical regular plural inflection -s) the English possessive morpheme 's (apostrophe alone after a regular plural affix, giving -s' as the standard mark for plural + possessive). Practice settled in the 18th century; before then, practices varied but typically all three endings were written -s (but without cumulation). This meant that only regular nouns bearing neither could be confidently identified, and plural and possessive could be potentially confused (e.g., "the Apostles words"; "those things over there are my husbands")—which undermines the logic of "marked" forms.
 Most common contractions have near-homographs from which they are distinguished in writing only by an apostrophe, for example it's (it is or it has), or she'd (she would or she had).

 Hyphen 
Hyphens are often used in English compound words. Written compound words may be hyphenated, open or closed, so specifics are guided by stylistic policy. Some writers may use a slash in certain instances.

 Frequencies 

The letter most commonly used in English is E. The least used letter is Z. The frequencies shown in the table may differ in practice according to the type of text.

 Phonology 

The letters A, E, I, O, and U are considered vowel letters, since (except when silent) they represent vowels, although I and U represent consonants in words such as "onion" and "quail" respectively.

The letter Y sometimes represents a consonant (as in "young") and sometimes a vowel (as in "myth"). Very rarely, W may represent a vowel (as in "cwm", a Welsh loanword).

The consonant sounds represented by the letters W and Y in English (/w/ and /j/ as in yes /jɛs/ and went /wɛnt/) are referred to as semi-vowels (or glides) by linguists, however this is a description that applies to the sounds represented by the letters and not to the letters themselves.

The remaining letters are considered consonant letters, since when not silent they generally represent consonants.

 History 

Old English

The English language itself was first written in the Anglo-Saxon futhorc runic alphabet, in use from the 5th century. This alphabet was brought to what is now England, along with the proto-form of the language itself, by Anglo-Saxon settlers. Very few examples of this form of written Old English have survived, mostly as short inscriptions or fragments.

The Latin script, introduced by Christian missionaries, began to replace the Anglo-Saxon futhorc from about the 7th century, although the two continued in parallel for some time. As such, the Old English alphabet began to employ parts of the Roman alphabet in its construction. Futhorc influenced the emerging English alphabet by providing it with the letters thorn (Þ þ) and wynn (Ƿ ƿ). The letter eth (Ð ð) was later devised as a modification of dee (D d), and finally yogh was created by Norman scribes from the insular g in Old English and Irish, and used alongside their Carolingian g.

The a-e ligature ash (Æ æ) was adopted as a letter in its own right, named after a futhorc rune æsc. In very early Old English the o-e ligature ethel (Œ œ) also appeared as a distinct letter, likewise named after a rune, œðel. Additionally, the v-v or u-u ligature double-u (W w) was in use.

In the year 1011, a monk named Byrhtferð recorded the traditional order of the Old English alphabet. He listed the 24 letters of the Latin alphabet first, including the ampersand, then 5 additional English letters, starting with the Tironian note ond (⁊), an insular symbol for and:

Modern English
In the orthography of Modern English, the letters thorn (þ), eth (ð), eng (ŋ),  wynn (ƿ), yogh, ash (æ), and ethel (œ) are obsolete. Latin borrowings reintroduced homographs of æ and œ into Middle English and Early Modern English, though they are largely obsolete (see "Ligatures in recent usage" below), and where they are used they are not considered to be separate letters (e.g., for collation purposes), but rather ligatures. Thorn and eth were both replaced by th, though thorn continued in existence for some time, its lowercase form gradually becoming graphically indistinguishable from the minuscule y in most handwriting. Y for th can still be seen in pseudo-archaisms such as "Ye Olde Booke Shoppe". The letters þ and ð are still used in present-day Icelandic (where they now represent two separate sounds,  and  having become phonemically-distinct - as indeed also happened in Modern English), while ð is still used in present-day Faroese (although only as a silent letter). Wynn disappeared from English around the 14th century when it was supplanted by uu, which ultimately developed into the modern w. Yogh disappeared around the 15th century and was typically replaced by gh.

The letters u and j, as distinct from v and i, were introduced in the 16th century, and w assumed the status of an independent letter. The variant lowercase form long s (ſ) lasted into early modern English, and was used in non-final position up to the early 19th century. Today, the English alphabet is considered to consist of the following 26 letters:

Written English has a number of digraphs, but they are not considered separate letters of the alphabet:

 Ligatures in recent usage 
Outside of professional papers on specific subjects that traditionally use ligatures in loanwords, ligatures are seldom used in modern English. The ligatures æ and œ were until the 19th century (slightly later in American English) used in formal writing for certain words of Greek or Latin origin, such as encyclopædia and cœlom, although such ligatures were not used in either classical Latin or ancient Greek. These are now usually rendered as "ae" and "oe" in all types of writing, although in American English, a lone e has mostly supplanted both (for example, encyclopedia for encyclopaedia, and maneuver for manoeuvre'').

These are not independent letters, but rather allographs.

Proposed reforms
Alternative scripts have been proposed for written English—mostly extending or replacing the basic English alphabet—such as the Deseret alphabet and the Shavian alphabet.

See also
 Alphabet song
 NATO phonetic alphabet
 English orthography
 English-language spelling reform
 American manual alphabet
 Two-handed manual alphabets
 English Braille
 American Braille
 New York Point
 Chinese respelling of the English alphabet
 Burmese respelling of the English alphabet
 Base36

Notes and references

Notes

References

Further reading
 
 

Alphabets
Alphabet
Latin alphabets